Outwood Academy Danum (formerly Danum School Technology College, Danum Academy and Intake Secondary Modern) is an academy school serving the east of Doncaster, South Yorkshire, England. Danum is the Roman name for Doncaster.

Admissions
It is for ages 11–18. The academy is split into two sites; the Main School which caters for the students in Years 7, 8, 9, 10 and 11 on Armthorpe Road and the Sixth Form Centre which educates Years 12 and 13 on Leger Way.
The main school site is next to the A18.

History

Grammar schools
Doncaster Technical High School for Girls became Doncaster Technical Grammar School for Girls in the early 1960s, later becoming Danum Grammar School for Girls on Danum Road. Doncaster Technical High School for Boys on Greyfriars Road moved to Armthorpe Road in the 1950s, and had a similar name change to the girls' school. Edward Semper, the headmaster of the boys' schools, was one of the UK's leading proponents of specialist technical schools.

The Danum Grammar School for Boys (c.500 boys) and Danum Grammar School for Girls merged in 1970 to form the co-educational selective Danum Grammar School. It had a technical bias, similar to a technical school. At the same time Doncaster Grammar School had merged with its analogous female school. The school was administered by the County Borough of Doncaster Education Committee and had around 800 boys and girls.

Comprehensive
In 1978 Danum Grammar School became the comprehensive Danum School, merging with Intake High School, located on Leger Way. Doncaster Grammar School became a comprehensive five years later in 1983.

Danum School gained Technology College status in 2002, and changed its name to reflect its new specialism.

Academy
On 1 September 2011 Danum School Technology College formally gained academy status, and changed its name to Danum Academy.

In 2016, Danum Academy was taken over by Outwood Grange Academies and its name was changed to Outwood Academy Danum.

Former teachers
 Peter Davies (politician)

Sixth form
Danum Sixth Form is located on Armthorpe Road and has approximately 450 students. The sixth form only accepts students with certain academic requirements; these are 6 GCSEs at grade C or above, including Maths and English.

In 2005, Danum Sixth Form achieved the highest point score per A Level than any other sixth form in Doncaster. Also, over 80% of leavers in 2005 continued their studies to pursue degree courses; these included Oxford and Cambridge.

In 2016, the sixth form's A Level results remained above the Doncaster average, with a progress score of +0.18 and an average grade of C.

Sport
The school won the English School's basketball championship in 2006, beating Shenfield School 76-65 in the National Final, which was played in the Hemel Hempstead sports centre.

Present day 
In 2022, it was announced that school bosses were trying to sell the 'Technical College Campus' (off Leger Way), both building and grounds, which had not been used for more than five years. The site is physically detached from the rest of the school.

As of January 2021, Amanda Crane has taken over the role principal of Outwood Academy Danum replacing the former-Principal Jane Gaunt.

In March 2023, a number of pupils have protested against the latest school policies which left toilet facilities locked behind a shutter during lesson time. This was received with heavy criticism from pupils, parents and the general public and has appeared in local news.

Notable alumni

 Jonti Picking - internet Flash animator, best known for his Weebl & Bob series
 Julia Mallam - actress, best known for being on Emmerdale
Danny Rose - footballer, currently playing for Tottenham Hotspur and England
Thomas Howes (actor) - best known for being on Downton Abbey

Danum Grammar School
 Neil Dudgeon - actor was known for his part in Midsomer Murders as John Barnaby
 Steve Hogarth - Musician and vocalist since 1989 with Marillion, previously with The Europeans and How We Live

Doncaster Technical High School for Boys
 David Pegg, Manchester United footballer who died in the Munich air disaster in February 1958

References

External links
 
 

Academies in Doncaster
Secondary schools in Doncaster
Danum